Brent Stover is a sportscaster who is employed by the CBS Sports Network.

Sportscasting career
Stover is a studio host and play-by-play announcer for CBS Sports.  He joined the network in 2010, announcing college football and college basketball, along with the World's Strongest Man competition.   He has performed a similar role with the Big Ten Network and FSN Midwest and FSN Southwest. He also has been a studio host for coverage of the St. Louis Cardinals and Pittsburgh Pirates and was a postgame host for the St. Louis Rams Radio Network. He was  the voice of the Chicago Sky of the WNBA.  He is an occasional guest host on the Artie Lange Show.  He also covers Major League Lacrosse and the Arena Football League on occasion on CBS Sports Network.

Personal life
Stover graduated from Kansas State University with a degree in journalism where he ran track-and-field and cross country.  He is an aspiring country musician playing around NYC.

References

Living people
People from Kansas
American sports announcers
Kansas State University alumni
St. Louis Rams announcers
Pittsburgh Pirates announcers
St. Louis Cardinals announcers
College basketball announcers in the United States
National Football League announcers
Major League Baseball broadcasters
College football announcers
Women's college basketball announcers in the United States
Women's National Basketball Association announcers
Arena football announcers
Lacrosse announcers
Boxing commentators
Year of birth missing (living people)